DXS may refer to:

Department of External Services, a fictional U.S. intelligence agency on the TV show MacGyver
Dexus, Australian stock exchange ticker symbol
DXS, a web service component formerly known as Get Hot New Stuff in KDE Software Compilation 4 
Deep Extragalactic Survey, one of five components of the UKIRT Infrared Deep Sky Survey
Diffuse X-ray Spectrometer, instrumentation on the NASA Space Shuttle mission STS-54